Jangalabad may refer to:
 Jangalabad, Anbarabad
 Jangalabad-e Bala, Jiroft County
 Jangalabad-e Pain, Jiroft County
 Jangalabad, Manujan
 Jangalabad, Qaleh Ganj
 Jangalabad, Rabor
 Jangalabad, Rigan